Aparajitha Balamurukan (born 17 March 1994) is an Indian female academic and professional squash player who is generally a regular member of the Indian squash team. She achieved her highest career PSA ranking of 77 in August 2010 during the 2010 PSA World Tour.

Early life 
Aparajitha was born in Erode and raised in Chennai. Her father Balamurukan was a prominent businessman. She took the interest on the sport of squash at the age of eight.

Career 
She joined the Professional Squash Association in 2009 at the age of 15 and took part in the 2009 PSA World Tour. She signed for a coaching camp in squash basic training at the ICL Academy. Aparajitha also completed her MBA degree while playing squash. 

She received her maiden opportunity to represent India at the 2012 Women's World Team Squash Championships and was part of the team which reached quarterfinals. She also represented India at the 2014 Asian Games and claimed a silver medal in the women's team event. In the same year, she also competed at the 2014 World University Squash Championship. However her career rankings dropped below 100 after 2014 despite a promising start to her career in 2009. 

At the 2019 Women's Asian Individual Squash Championships, she reached third round of the event and lost to Hong Kong's Liu Tsz Ling.

References

External links 
 
 

1994 births
Living people
Indian female squash players
Asian Games silver medalists for India
Asian Games medalists in squash
Squash players at the 2014 Asian Games
Medalists at the 2014 Asian Games
Sportspeople from Chennai
21st-century Indian women
21st-century Indian people